Farmed and Dangerous is a four-part webisode comedy series from Chipotle Mexican Grill that was released across 4 webisodes in February and March 2014. The series was a satire of "Big Ag" and "Big Food" practices, featuring the fictional megacorporation Animoil feeding cows petropellets, which are made from petroleum directly rather than indirectly, from the corn and soybean that require so much petroleum products to grow (nitrogen fertilizer is made from the nitrogen present in the air and hydrogen present in natural gas from fracking).

The series is part of an unconventional Chipotle marketing campaign to make people think about the origins of their food. Some agricultural groups have criticized the series as unrealistic. Along with the webisodes, people are also invited to play trivia based on each episode via their phone to win prizes from Chipotle.

Webisodes
 Oiling the Food Chain – February 17, 2014
 Passing the Buck – February 24, 2014
 Raising the Steaks – March 3, 2014
 Ends Meat – March 10, 2014

Cast and characters
Ray Wise as Buck Marshall: The head of a consulting public relations firm for Animoil called the Industrial Food Image Bureau (I.F.I.B.), he is tasked with maintaining and repairing the public image of both the company, and its new product: the petropellet. In addition to heading up the PR of Animoil, he is also their chief spokesperson; appearing in their advertisements and public statements. Marshall and the I.F.I.B. were also tasked with getting a tax break for a company that specializes in producing industrial pesticide to combat weeds so that they can develop a new pesticide (Agent Banana) to combat the new 'Super Pigweed' that has developed as a result of the older weeds growing more resistant to the pesticides. 
Karynn Moore as Sophia Marshall: The daughter of Buck, she is given a job at I.F.I.B. by her father and is tasked with seducing Chip Randell after he surfaces and to speak publicly in favor of Animoil and the petropellet. However, through this endeavor she learns about the sustainable food movement and begins to change her views. 
John Sloan as Chip Randell: A free-range cattle farmer and the head of the Sustainable Family Farming Association. He publicizes a video of a cow exploding after consuming petropellets, he is then targeted by Marshall and his crew in an attempt to remove the video from the internet, refute its authenticity, and prosecute Randell as well as other food activists. 
Thomas Mikusz as Dr. van Riefkind: A German speaking food scientist from Austria. He was responsible for the development and testing of Animoil's new products. He created petropellet, as well as a number of other things including an eight-winged chicken. It is also presumable that he created the 'petrochicken' that appears in Episode 2 that burns when placed on the grill.

See also
 Intensive farming

References

External links
 

2014 American television series debuts
2010s American television miniseries
2014 American television series endings
Chipotle Mexican Grill